Ecclesia and Synagoga, or Ecclesia et Synagoga in Latin, meaning "Church and Synagogue", are a pair of figures personifying the Church and the Jewish synagogue, that is to say Judaism, found in medieval Christian art.  They often appear sculpted as large figures on either side of a church portal, as in the most famous examples, those at Strasbourg Cathedral.  They may also be found standing on either side of the cross in scenes of the Crucifixion, especially in Romanesque art, and less frequently in a variety of other contexts.

The two female figures are usually young and attractive; Ecclesia is generally adorned with a crown, chalice and cross-topped staff, looking confidently forward. In contrast, Synagoga is blindfolded and drooping, carrying a broken lance (possibly an allusion to the Holy Lance that stabbed Christ) and the Tablets of the Law or Torah scrolls that may even be slipping from her hand. The staff and spear may have pennants flying from them. In images of the Crucifixion, Ecclesia may hold a chalice that catches the blood spurting from the side of Christ; she often holds the chalice as an attribute in other contexts. Attributes sometimes carried by Synagoga include a sheep or goat or just its head, signifying Old Testament sacrifice, in contrast to Ecclesia's chalice which represents the Christian Eucharist. If not blindfolded, Synagoga usually looks down. Ecclesia has an earlier history, and in medieval art Synagoga occasionally appears alone in various contexts, but the pair, or Ecclesia by herself, are far more common. Further subjects where the pair may sometimes be found are the Tree of Jesse, and the Nativity.

The first appearance of such figures in a Crucifixion is in a historiated initial in the Drogo Sacramentary of c. 830, but though Ecclesia already has most of her usual features already present, the figure representing the Jews or the Old Covenant is here a seated white-haired old man.  The pair, now with a female Jewish partner, are then found in several later Carolingian carved ivory relief panels of the Crucifixion for book covers, dating from around 870, and remain common in miniatures and various small works until the 10th century.  They are then less common in Crucifixions in the 11th century, but reappear in the 12th century in a more strongly contrasted way that emphasizes the defeat of Synagoga; it is at this point that a blindfolded Synagoga with a broken lance becomes usual.  The figures continue to be found in Crucifixions until the early 14th century, and occur later in various contexts but are increasingly less common. The surviving portal figures mainly date from the 13th century.

Meaning

The medieval figures reflect the Christian belief, sometimes called Supersessionism, that Jesus was the Jewish Messiah, and that Judaism as a religion was therefore made unnecessary, by its own tenets, once Christianity was established, and that all Jews should convert. Today opposed by dual-covenant theology, this belief was universal in the medieval church.  Synagoga's blindfold reflected the refusal of medieval Jews to "see" this point, which was regarded as stubborn.  The Gospel of Matthew (27, 51) related that the Veil of the Temple, covering the entrance to the Holy of Holies, tore at the moment of Christ's death on the cross, which was taken to symbolize the moment of the replacement of Judaism by Christianity as the true religion, hence the presence of the pair in Crucifixion scenes.

The blind covering Synagoga's eyes derived from the letter of Saint Paul at II Corinthians 3:13-16:

We are not like Moses, who would put a veil over his face to prevent the Israelites from seeing the end of what was passing away. 14 But their minds were made dull, for to this day the same veil remains when the old covenant is read. It has not been removed, because only in Christ is it taken away. 15 Even to this day when Moses is read, a veil covers their hearts. 16 But whenever anyone turns to the Lord, the veil is taken away.

The sculpted portal figures are generally found on the cathedrals of larger cities in northern Europe that had significant Jewish communities, especially in Germany, and apart from their theological significance, were certainly also intended to remind Jews of their place in a Christian society, by projecting "an ideal of Jewish submission within an ideally ordered Christian realm".  They are therefore very prominent, but not very common. Many Jews, like Christians, conducted business in churches, and would pass the figures as they came and went. However, Leo Spitzer claimed that unlike many medieval depictions of Jewish figures (other than those from the Hebrew Bible), there is very rarely any element of a hostile caricature in the depiction of Synagoga who, if clearly defeated, is often strikingly beautiful, as at Strasbourg.

There are examples on the portals of the cathedrals at Minden, Bamberg and Freiburg Minster in Germany, as well as Notre Dame de Paris and Metz in France. In England there are remains of pairs, after damage or destruction in the English Reformation, from the cathedrals of Rochester, Lincoln, Salisbury, and Winchester; the cathedrals of the two largest commercial centres, London and York, both date from later periods, but may have had them on earlier buildings. Surviving from the chapter house of York Minster are over life-size paintings on oak from a group of 48 supporting the roof vault and stained glass figures from the vestibule. Châlons Cathedral and the Basilique Saint-Denis have versions in stained glass, respectively large and small. During the 14th century they become much rarer, replaced in Crucifixion scenes by large numbers of figures of soldiers and disciples, but some examples are found in the 15th century and later.  A rare carved misericord at Erfurt Cathedral shows the pair jousting on horses; unsurprisingly, Ecclesia is winning.  As with many misericords, this was probably intended as a humorous version of iconography treated with full seriousness in more prominent locations.

In her book on the pair, Nina Rowe is sceptical of the traditional assumption of art historians that the hostility implicit in later depictions is found in the earliest ones.  She relates the figures to Late Antique uses of personifications, including contrasting figures of orthodox Christianity and either paganism or heresy, especially Arianism, and suggests that the identity of "Synagoga" was more variable before the millennium, with Jerusalem or its Temple being alternative identifications.  She describes the revival in use of the pair, now couched in more combative terms, as a reaction both to the influx into Western Europe of larger Jewish populations during the late 10th to the 12th centuries, and also to the Twelfth-century Renaissance, which involved contacts between Christian and Jewish scholars, who discussed their different interpretations of the Hebrew Bible.  This made Christian theologians, mostly monastic, much more aware than previously of the existence of a vibrant Jewish theological tradition subsequent to the writing of the Hebrew Bible.  Previously, Early Medieval Christians had likened the Jews to, as they were described by Augustine, "librarians" or "capsarii", a class of servant that was in charge of carrying books, but did not actually read them.  The increased contacts therefore had the paradoxical effect of making monasteries more aware that there was an alternative tradition of exegesis and scholarship, and stimulating them to counter this.

There was also a tradition of dramatized disputations between the two figures, which reached its height somewhat later than depictions in art, but had a similar geographical distribution.

Ecclesia alone

The personification of Ecclesia preceded her coupling with Synagoga by several centuries. A number of biblical passages, including those describing Christ as a "bridegroom" led early in the history of the church to the concept of the church as the Bride of Christ, which was shown in art using a queenly personification. The church was in this context sometimes conflated with the Virgin Mary, leading to the concept of Maria Ecclesia, or Mary as the church, which is an element, now usually unrecognised, in the theology behind much of the art showing the Virgin as a queen.

An earlier appearance of two female figures is in the now heavily restored apse mosaic of Santa Pudenziana in Rome (402-417), where two female figures behind a row of apostles hold wreaths over Saints Paul and Peter respectively, and towards an enthroned Christ.  These are usually taken to represent the "Church of the Gentiles" and "Church of the Jews" - i.e. groups within the Early Christian Church which still reflected their pre-conversion backgrounds. The figures are hardly differentiated.  A mosaic at Santa Sabina in Rome appears to have similar figures, though the Peter and Paul are now missing and only known from an old drawing.

Wise and Foolish Virgins
High medieval depictions of the New Testament parable of the Wise and Foolish Virgins sometimes used the iconography of Ecclesia and Synagoga. This is not done in the German portal sculptures, several on the same buildings that feature figures of Ecclesia and Synagoga, as for example Strasbourg and Minden Cathedrals.  It can be seen very clearly in the Darmstadt manuscript of the Speculum Humanae Salvationis illustrated here, from about 1360, where the leading virgins of each group have all the attributes of Ecclesia and Synagoga, and the lamp of the leading Wise Virgin has become a chalice.  The interpretation of the parable in terms of wise Christian and foolish Jewish virgins, the latter missing the wedding party, long remained common in sermons and theological literature, and has been argued to be present in Handel's oratorio Messiah (1741).

Modern developments

The pair as a subject has often been avoided by modern artists, but after Napoleon occupied Milan in 1805, he ordered the completion of the façade of Milan Cathedral, to include secularized representations of Synagoga and Ecclesia, symbolizing the legal equality of all religions under the French regime. Synagoga stands upright, holding the Ten Commandments, while Ecclesia is portrayed as the Lady of Liberty, complete with crown and torch.

They each have a painting (1919) by John Singer Sargent in the Boston Public Library, as part of a larger scheme.  

In 2015, Saint Joseph's University in Philadelphia commissioned a large sculpture by Joshua Koffman showing the pair in harmony. The sculpture is aimed to commemorate the 50th anniversary of the Declaration Nostra aetate. Both personifications wear crowns and hold their respective Holy Scriptures, the pair suggesting the notion of learning one from another.  The final, bronze cast version of the sculpture was blessed by Pope Francis at St Joseph's University in September 2015.
Pope Francis was a natural choice to bless the sculpture as only a year or so prior to the installation, Pope Francis wrote:
We hold the Jewish people in special regard because their covenant with God has never been revoked, for “the gifts and the call of God are irrevocable” (Rom 11:29). … Dialogue and friendship with the children of Israel are part of the life of Jesus’ disciples. The friendship which has grown between us makes us bitterly and sincerely regret the terrible persecutions which they have endured, and continue to endure, especially those that have involved Christians. God continues to work among the people of the Old Covenant and to bring forth treasures of wisdom which flow from their encounter with his word. For this reason, the Church also is enriched when she receives the values of Judaism.—Pope Francis, Evangelii Gaudium, §247-249.

Notes

References

Alexander, Jonathan & Binski, Paul (eds), Age of Chivalry, Art in Plantagenet England, 1200–1400, Royal Academy/Weidenfeld & Nicolson, London 1987
Kitzinger, Ernst, Byzantine art in the making: main lines of stylistic development in Mediterranean art, 3rd-7th century, 1977, Faber & Faber,  (US: Cambridge UP, 1977)
Lewis, Suzanne, "Tractatus adversus Judaeos in the Gulbenkian Apocalypse", The Art Bulletin, Vol. 68, No. 4 (Dec., 1986), pp. 543–566, JSTOR
Michael, Robert, A History of Catholic Antisemitism: The Dark Side of the Church, 2008, Macmillan, 
Marissen, Michael, "Rejoicing against Judaism in Handel's Messiah", The Journal of Musicology, Vol. 24, No. 2 (Spring 2007), pp. 167–194, University of California Press, DOI: 10.1525/jm.2007.24.2.167, JSTOR
Rose, Christine, "The Jewish Mother-in-law; Synagoga and the Man of Law's Tale", in Delany, Sheila (ed), Chaucer and the Jews : Sources, Contexts, Meanings, 2002, Routledge, google books
Rowe, Nina, The Jew, the Cathedral and the Medieval City: Synagoga and Ecclesia in the Thirteenth Century, 2011, Cambridge University Press, google books
Schiller, Gertud, Iconography of Christian Art, (English trans from German), Lund Humphries, London, Vol. I, 1971, Vol. II, 1972, 
Schreckenberg, Heinz, The Jews in Christian Art, 1996, Continuum, New York,  (this devotes Chapter III, pp. 31–66, to the theme)
Spitzer, Leo, review of Die religiöse Disputation in der europäischen Dichtung des Mittelalters: I. Der allegorische Streit zwischen Synagoge und Kirche by Hiram Pflaum, Speculum, Vol. 13, No. 3 (Jul., 1938), pp. 356–360, Medieval Academy of America, JSTOR
Weshler, Judith Glatzer, "A Change in the Iconography of the Song of Songs in 12th and 13th century Latin Bible", in: Glatzer, Nahum Norbert, Fishbane, Michael A., Mendes-Flohr, Paul R., Texts and Responses: Studies Presented to Nahum N. Glatzer on the Occasion of his Seventieth Birthday by his Students, 1975, Brill Archive, google books

External links 
 Ecclesia at the Christian Iconography web site

Supersessionism
Christianity and Judaism
Christian terminology
Christian iconography
Personifications
Christian anti-Judaism
Jews and Judaism in art